Tirumanur is a village in the Vazhapadi taluk of Salem district, in Tamil Nadu, India.

Geography
Tirumanur is within Vazhapadi taluk, which is in the central part of Salem district. Tirumanur is situated to the northeast of the Bodhamalai Hills of Namakkal district.

Demographics
In 2011 Tirumanur had a population of 5,282 people living in 1,467 households. 2,616 (49.9%) of the inhabitants were male, while 2,666 (50.1%) were female. 496 children in the town, about 9% of the population, were at or below the age of 6. The literacy rate in the town was 65.2%. Scheduled Castes and Scheduled Tribes accounted for 29.% and 5.6% of the population, respectively.

References

Villages in Salem district
Villages in Vazhapadi taluk